

tm-tn
TMP-SMX
TNKase

to

tob-tod
tobicillin (INN)
toborinone (INN)
TobraDex
tobramycin (INN)
Tobrasone
Tobrex
tobuterol (INN)
tocainide (INN)
tocamphyl (INN)
toceranib (USAN, INN)
tocilizumab (INN)
tocofenoxate (INN)
tocofersolan (INN)
tocofibrate (INN)
Today
todralazine (INN)

tof
tofacitinib (USAN)
tofenacin (INN)
tofetridine (INN)
tofimilast (USAN)
tofisopam (INN)
tofogliflozin (USAN, INN)
Tofranil

tol
Tol-Tab

tola-tolm
tolafentrine (INN)
tolamolol (INN)
tolazamide (INN)
tolazoline (INN)
tolboxane (INN)
tolbutamide (INN)
tolcapone (INN)
tolciclate (INN)
toldimfos (INN)
Tolectin
tolevamer potassium sodium (USAN)
tolevamer sodium (USAN)
tolfamide (INN)
tolfenamic acid (INN)
tolgabide (INN)
tolimidone (INN)
Tolinase
tolindate (INN)
toliodium chloride (INN)
toliprolol (INN)
tolmesoxide (INN)
tolmetin (INN)

toln-toly
tolnaftate (INN)
tolnapersine (INN)
tolnidamine (INN)
toloconium metilsulfate (INN)
tolonidine (INN)
tolonium chloride (INN)
toloxatone (INN)
toloxychlorinol (INN)
tolpadol (INN)
tolpentamide (INN)
tolperisone (INN)
tolpiprazole (INN)
tolpovidone (131 I) (INN)
tolpronine (INN)
tolpropamine (INN)
tolpyrramide (INN)
tolquinzole (INN)
tolrestat (INN)
tolterodine (INN)
toltrazuril (INN)
Tolu-Sed DM
tolufazepam (INN)
tolycaine (INN)

tom-toq
tomelukast (INN)
Tomocat
tomoglumide (INN)
tomopenem (USAN)
tomoxetine (INN)
tomoxiprole (INN)
Tomudex
Tomycine
tonapofylline (USAN, INN)
tonazocine (INN)
Tonocard
Tonopaque
tonzonium bromide (INN)
Topamax
Topicaine
Topicort
Topicycline
topiramate (INN)
topiroxostat (INN)
topixantrone (USAN)
Toposar
topotecan (INN)
toprilidine (INN)
Toprol-XL
Topsyn
topterone (INN)
toquizine (INN)

tor-toz
Tora
Toradol
toralizumab (USAN)
torapsel (USAN)
torasemide (INN)
torbafylline (INN)
torcetrapib (USAN)
torcitabine (USAN)
Torecan
toremifene (INN)
torezolid (USAN)
toripristone (INN)
Tornalate
tosactide (INN)
tosagestin (USAN)
tosedostat (USAN, INN)
tosifen (INN)
tositumomab (INN)
tosufloxacin (INN)
tosulur (INN)
tosylchloramide sodium (INN)
Totacillin
totrombopag choline (USAN)
tozadenant (USAN)
tozalinone (INN)
tozasertib (USAN, INN)
tozinameran (INN)

tp
TPN Electrolytes
TPN Suspension